Scattering Dad is a 1998 American made-for-television drama film directed by Joan Tewkesbury and starring Olympia Dukakis and Andy Griffith. It aired on CBS on January 4, 1998.

Premise
An agoraphobic woman who hasn't left her home in 20 years receives a visit from the spirit of her deceased husband who reminds her of a promise she made to scatter his ashes at his favorite vacation spot. With her daughters unavailable, she sets off to fulfill the promise herself.

Cast
Olympia Dukakis as Dotty
Lucinda Jenney as Molly
Michelle Burke as Taylor
August Schellenberg as Fierce Crow
Andy Griffith as Hiram
Jo Harvey Allen as Reva
Elaine Miles as Elaine

References

1998 television films
1998 films
1998 drama films
CBS network films
1990s English-language films
Films scored by Michel Colombier
American drama television films
Films directed by Joan Tewkesbury
1990s American films